The Odisha Computer Application Centre or OCAC is a Designated Technical Directorate of Information Technology Department Public Sector Undertaking (PSU) of Government of Odisha registered under Society Registration Act, 1860 on dated 21 March 1985 redesignated as Technical Directorate of Information Technology Department, Government of Odisha.

Projects
 OSWAS(Odisha Secretariate Workflow Automation System)
Bhubaneswar Development Authority – Customer Care System
Computerisation of Land Records
Directorate of Animal Husbandry & Veterinary Services – SMS Based Reporting System
Employee Database for Finance Department with DFID and Bannock Consulting
Food Supplies and Consumer Welfare Department –  PDS Information System
Odisha Tourism Development Corporation – Hospitality Management System
Panchayati Raj Department — BETAN (Payroll Information System)
Health and Family Welfare Department – Computerisation of SCB Medical College & Hospital (SCBMCH), Cuttack
Improving Citizen Access to Information (UNDP Supported Project)
School & Mass Education Department – e-Sishu (Child Tracking System-2005)
State Election Commission – Preparation of Electoral Rolls and Photo Identity Cards (EPIC Project)
W & CD Department – e Pragati
W & CD Department, Government of Odisha – Scheme Information System
OCAC Training Centre;– Joint Venture of OCAC & OKCL

Services
Industry Facilitation
IT Consultancy: Hardware and Software Evaluation, Implementation of RDBMS-Based Information Systems and Enterprise Wide Solutions, Site Preparation & Hardware Installation, Software Design, System Analysis, System Study, Tender Processing and Procurement, Web Hosting and Maintenance
Schemes Development
Training & Education

Events Organized
2nd E-Odisha Summit 2014 on 24 January 2014 at Hotel Swosti Premium, Bhubaneswar	
15th National Conference on E-Governance, Bhubaneswar, on 9 & 10 February 2012 at KIIT Auditorium, Bhubaneswar	
Orissa IT 2008 on 2 & 3 July 2008 at Hotel Swosti Plaza, Bhubaneswar	
French Film Festival on 31 March 2007, IDCOL Auditorium, Bhubaneswar	
Russian Cultural Festival on 24 March 2007 at Hotel Swosti Plaza, Bhubaneswar

References

External links
Official Website of Odisha Computer Application Centre (OCAC)
Official Website of OCAC Training Centre (OCAC)

Economy of Bhubaneswar
State agencies of Odisha
E-government in India
1985 establishments in Orissa
Indian companies established in 1985